Fare Thee Well may refer to:

 "Fare Thee Well" (poem), an 1816 poem by Lord Byron
 "Fare Thee Well" (song), an English folk ballad
 "Dink's Song", or "Fare Thee Well", an American folk song
 Fare Thee Well: Celebrating 50 Years of the Grateful Dead, a series of concerts by the Grateful Dead
 Fare Thee Well: Celebrating 50 Years of the Grateful Dead (album), an album featuring music from the concerts

See also 

 Farewell (disambiguation)